The Tall Country is a Canadian short documentary film, directed by Osmond Borradaile and released in 1958. Commissioned by the Government of British Columbia to commemorate the provincial centennial, the film depicts various aspects of life and work in the province. It was narrated by Canadian Broadcasting Corporation announcer George McLean.

The film was one of three co-winners, alongside The Quest and Money Minters, of the Canadian Film Award for Best Theatrical Short Film at the 11th Canadian Film Awards in 1959.

References

External links
The Tall Country at the Canadian Educational, Sponsored, and Industrial Film (CESIF) Project, Concordia University

1958 films
Canadian short documentary films
Best Theatrical Short Film Genie and Canadian Screen Award winners
National Film Board of Canada short films
1958 short films
Films shot in British Columbia
1950s English-language films
1950s Canadian films